Klaus Quaet-Faslem (5 September 1913 – 30 January 1944) was a Luftwaffe ace and recipient of the Knight's Cross of the Iron Cross during World War II. The Knight's Cross of the Iron Cross was awarded to recognise extreme battlefield bravery or successful military leadership. On 30 January 1944 he was killed in a flying accident due to bad weather. He was posthumously awarded the Knight's Cross on 9 June 1944. During his career he was credited with 49 aerial victories.

Career
On 20 October 1940,  Quaet-Faslem was transferred from Jagdfliegerschule 1 (1st fighter pilot school) at Werneuchen to III. Gruppe (3rd group) of Jagdgeschwader 53 (JG 53—53rd Fighter Wing) where he assumed the position of adjutant. At the time, III. Gruppe was commanded by Hauptmann Wolf-Dietrich Wilcke.

Operation Barbarossa
In preparation of Operation Barbarossa, the German invasion of the Soviet Union, JG 53 arrived in Mannheim-Sandhofen on 8 June 1941 where the aircraft were given a maintenance overhaul. On 12 June, the Geschwader began its relocation east, with III. Gruppe moving to Suwałki in northeastern Poland. Two days later, III. Gruppe transferred to a forward airfield at Sobolewo.

On 21 November 1941, Quaet-Faslem was appointed Staffelkapitän (squadron leader) of 2. Staffel of JG 53, succeeding Oberleutnant Ignaz Prestele who was transferred.

On 19 August 1942, Quaet-Faslem was transferred and was succeeded by Leutant Walter Zellot as commander of 2. Staffel of JG 53. On 31 August, he took command of I. Gruppe of Jagdgeschwader 3 "Udet" (JG 3—3rd Fighter Wing), succeeding Hauptmann Georg Michalek.

On 17 August 1943 during the Schweinfurt-Regensburg mission, Quaet-Faslem claimed his 48th aerial victory when he shot down a Boeing B-17 Flying Fortress bomber.

On 30 January 1944, Quaet-Faslem was killed in a flying accident when his Messerschmitt Bf 109 G-6 (Werknummer 15243—factory number) crashed in bad weather at Langeleben near Helmstedt. Following his death, Hauptmann Joachim von Wehren temporarily assumed command of the Gruppe before Hauptmann Josef Haiböck officially took command on 8 February. His grave is located on the  cemetery Mönchengladbach-Holt, next to the grave of Wolf-Dietrich Wilcke.

Summary of military career

Aerial victory claims
According to Obermaier, Quaet-Faslem was credited with 49 aerial victories, of which 41 were claimed on the Eastern Front, one over Poland and seven over the Western Allies, including two four-engine heavy bombers. Mathews and Foreman, authors of Luftwaffe Aces — Biographies and Victory Claims, researched the German Federal Archives and found records for 49 aerial victory claims, plus one further unconfirmed claim. This figure includes 42 aerial victories on the Eastern Front and seven on the Western Front, including two four-engine heavy bombers and one de Havilland Mosquito fighter bomber.

Victory claims were logged to a map-reference (PQ = Planquadrat), for example "PQ 4939". These sectors were then subdivided into 36 smaller units to give a location area 3 × 4 km in size.

Awards
 Honour Goblet of the Luftwaffe on 21 September 1942 as Oberleutnant and pilot
 German Cross in Gold on 29 October 1942 as Oberleutnant in the I./Jagdgeschwader 53
 Knight's Cross of the Iron Cross on 9 June 1944 (posthumously) as Major and Gruppenkommandeur of the I./Jagdgeschwader 3 "Udet"

Citations

References

Citations

Bibliography

 
 
 
 
 
 
 
 
 
 
 
 
 
 
 
 
 
 
 

1913 births
1944 deaths
Aviators killed in aviation accidents or incidents in Germany
Military personnel from Kiel
German World War II flying aces
Recipients of the Gold German Cross
Recipients of the Knight's Cross of the Iron Cross
People from the Province of Schleswig-Holstein
Victims of aviation accidents or incidents in 1944